European Parliament election, 1987 may refer to:
European Parliament election, 1987 (Spain)
European Parliament election, 1987 (Portugal)